General Bowles may refer to:

George Bowles (British Army officer) (1787–1876), British Army general
Phineas Bowles (British Army officer, born 1690) (1690–1749), British Army lieutenant general
Phineas Bowles (British Army officer, died 1722) (died 1722), British Army major general
Robert Bowles (East India Company officer) (1744–1812), British East India Company major general